Dimitri Kévin Cavaré (born 5 February 1995) is a Guadeloupean professional footballer who plays for Swiss club FC Sion and the Guadeloupe national team as a right-back.

Career

Lens
Cavaré is a product of the RC Lens academy. He made his Ligue 2 debut on 17 August 2013 in a 4–1 home win against AJ Auxerre. He came onto the field after 60 minutes for Jean-Philippe Gbamin. He proceeded to make 21 league appearances for Lens in a two-year period, but failed to score for the club.

Stade Rennais
In January 2015, Cavaré agreed to join Rennes at the end of the season. One month later, he suffered a severe ligament injury and was ruled out of action for the rest of the season. In the summer of 2015, he joined up with his new club but continued to suffer from his injury in the early stages of the 2015–16 season.

In July he went on trial to newly promoted Premier League club Huddersfield Town but failed to earn a contract.

Barnsley
On 17 August 2017, Cavaré joined Championship club Barnsley on a two year deal. He made his debut against Sunderland on 1 January 2018. He scored his first goal for the club in a 3–1 loss at Aston Villa on 20 January 2018. He scored his second Barnsley goal in a 2–2 draw with Scunthorpe United with a curling right footed strike into the top corner from 25 yards out, completing a 2–0 comeback from Barnsley.

His contract was extended by Barnsley at the end of the 2018–19 season.

FC Sion
On 17 February 2020, with 4 months left on his contract, Cavaré signed for Swiss side Sion for an undisclosed fee.

International career
Cavaré was born in Guadeloupe, but originally represented the France U20s. He debuted for the Guadeloupe national football team in a friendly 2–0 loss to French Guiana on 7 June 2018.

Career statistics

Honours
Barnsley
EFL League One runner-up: 2018–19

Individual
PFA Team of the Year: 2018–19 League One

References

External links

 
 

1995 births
Living people
Association football fullbacks
Guadeloupean footballers
Guadeloupe international footballers
French footballers
France youth international footballers
French people of Guadeloupean descent
Ligue 1 players
Ligue 2 players
RC Lens players
Stade Rennais F.C. players
Barnsley F.C. players
FC Sion players
2021 CONCACAF Gold Cup players
French expatriate footballers
Guadeloupean expatriate footballers
Expatriate footballers in England
Expatriate footballers in Switzerland
French expatriate sportspeople in England
French expatriate sportspeople in Switzerland
Guadeloupean expatriate sportspeople in England
Guadeloupean expatriate sportspeople in Switzerland